The Oaks is a historic mansion located along Louisiana Highway 172, about  west of Keachi, Louisiana, U.S.. It was built in Greek Revival c.1855 by Henry F. Fullilove. The house was sold to Silas F. Talbert and his wife, Bella Horn Talbert, in 1877 and remained property of Talbert family until c.1960. In 1974 the mansion was purchased by Mr. and Mrs. Donald B. Fisher.

The mansion was listed on the National Register of Historic Places on January 19, 1989.

See also
National Register of Historic Places listings in DeSoto Parish, Louisiana

References

Houses on the National Register of Historic Places in Louisiana
Greek Revival architecture in Louisiana
Houses completed in 1855
National Register of Historic Places in DeSoto Parish, Louisiana
Houses in DeSoto Parish, Louisiana